Luigi Alberto Trivino (born October 1, 1991) is an American professional baseball pitcher for the New York Yankees of Major League Baseball (MLB). He was drafted by the Oakland Athletics in the 11th round of the 2013 Major League Baseball draft, and made his MLB debut in 2018.

Amateur career
After graduating from Upper Bucks Christian School where he played for the baseball, basketball and soccer teams, Trivino played college baseball at Slippery Rock University of Pennsylvania. In 2013, his junior year, he went 7–5 with a 1.83 ERA in 13 games (12 starts). After the season, he was drafted by the Oakland Athletics in the 11th round of the 2013 Major League Baseball draft.

Professional career

Oakland Athletics
Trivino signed and made his professional debut that same year with the Vermont Lake Monsters where he was 3–4 with a 3.12 ERA in 14 games (ten starts). In 2014, he played for the Beloit Snappers where he compiled a 7–11 record and 5.28 ERA in 27 games (26 starts), and in 2015, he pitched for the Stockton Ports, going 10–5 with a 3.91 ERA and 1.27 WHIP in 89.2 innings pitched. Trivino spent 2016 with both Stockton and the Midland RockHounds, pitching to a combined 2–4 record and 2.85 ERA in 45 combined relief appearances, and 2017 with Midland and the Nashville Sounds where he was 8–3 with a 3.03 ERA in 68.1 innings pitched between the two teams.  The Athletics added him to their 40-man roster after the 2017 season. 

Trivino began the 2018 season with Nashville, but was promoted to Oakland on April 17, making his MLB debut that night against the Chicago White Sox. The next day, also against the White Sox in 14 innings, he earned his first MLB win pitching three shutout innings allowing two hits and striking out four. For the season, Trivino appeared in 69 games, collecting an ERA of 2.92 in 74 innings. He recorded a record of 8–3 with 4 saves. In the 2018 AL Wild Card Game, Trivino posted three shutout innings following a difficult September.

In 2019, despite a strong start, Trivino was temporarily demoted from his role as the primary setup man after a stretch of four appearances in which he gave up nine runs (eight earned) in 4.2 innings, causing his ERA to balloon from 2.42 to 4.40. Trivino did not find the same success as the previous season, ending with an ERA of 5.25 in 61 games. In 2020, he recorded an ERA of 3.86 in 20 games.

Trivino began the 2021 season as part of a closer-by-committee arrangement with the departure of Liam Hendriks via free agency. For July, Trivino won the Reliever of the Month Award in the American League.

New York Yankees
The Athletics traded Trivino and Frankie Montas to the New York Yankees for JP Sears, Ken Waldichuk, Luis Medina, and Cooper Bowman on August 1, 2022. On November 18, Trivino signed a one-year, $4.1 million contract, avoiding arbitration.

References

External links

1991 births
Living people
American people of Italian descent
Baseball players from Pennsylvania
Major League Baseball pitchers
Oakland Athletics players
New York Yankees players
Slippery Rock baseball players
Vermont Lake Monsters players
Beloit Snappers players
Stockton Ports players
Midland RockHounds players
Nashville Sounds players